Eveliina "Eve" Sarapää (born 29 September 1976, in Oulu) is a Finnish architect and former football midfielder. She played for FC Honka and HJK Helsinki of the Naisten Liiga as well as Asker Fotball of the Norwegian Toppserien.

She was a member of the Finnish national team, and played at the 2005 European Championship.

Sarapää attended Oslo School of Architecture and Design while playing in Norway and became an architect after her football career.

Titles
 5 Finnish League (1999, 2000, 2001, 2005, 2007)
 4 Finnish Cups (1999, 2000, 2002, 2006)

References

1976 births
21st-century Finnish architects
Living people
People from Oulu
Expatriate women's footballers in Norway
Finland women's international footballers
Finnish expatriate footballers
Finnish women architects
Finnish women's footballers
Asker Fotball (women) players
Toppserien players
Helsingin Jalkapalloklubi (women) players
FC Honka (women) players
Kansallinen Liiga players
Finnish expatriate sportspeople in Norway
Oslo School of Architecture and Design alumni
20th-century Finnish women artists
21st-century Finnish women artists
Women's association football defenders
Women's association football midfielders